The Futagojima islets comprise a group of rocky islets and reefs lying about 700 m off the coast of Kitakamicho in Miyagi Prefecture, Japan. They have been recognised as an Important Bird Area (IBA) by BirdLife International because they support a population of black-tailed gulls.

References

Important Bird Areas of Japan
Seabird colonies
Islands of Miyagi Prefecture